Heraclides Ponticus ( Herakleides; c. 390 BC – c. 310 BC) was a Greek philosopher and astronomer who was born in Heraclea Pontica, now Karadeniz Ereğli, Turkey, and migrated to Athens. He is best remembered for proposing that the Earth rotates on its axis, from west to east, once every 24 hours. He is also hailed as the originator of the heliocentric theory, although this is doubted by some.

Life
Heraclides' father was Euthyphron, a wealthy nobleman who sent his son to study at the Platonic Academy in Athens under its founder Plato and under his successor Speusippus. According to the Suda, Plato, on his departure for Sicily in 361/360 BC, left the Academy in the charge of Heraclides. Heraclides was nearly elected successor to Speusippus as head of the academy in 339/338 BC, but narrowly lost to Xenocrates.

Work
All of Heraclides' writings have been lost; only a few fragments remain. Like the Pythagoreans Hicetas and Ecphantus, Heraclides proposed that the apparent daily motion of the stars was created by the rotation of the Earth on its axis once a day. This view contradicted the accepted Aristotelian model of the universe, which said that the Earth was fixed and that the stars and planets in their respective spheres might also be fixed. Simplicius  says that Heraclides proposed that the irregular movements of the planets can be explained if the Earth moves while the Sun stays still.

Although some historians have proposed that Heraclides taught that Venus and Mercury revolve around the Sun, a detailed investigation of the sources has shown that "nowhere in the ancient literature mentioning Heraclides of Pontus is there a clear reference for his support for any kind of heliocentrical planetary position".

A punning on his name, dubbing him Heraclides "Pompicus," suggests he may have been a rather vain and pompous man and the target of much ridicule. According to Diogenes Laërtius, Heraclides forged plays under the name of Thespis; this time drawing from a different source, Dionysius the Deserter, he composed plays and forged them under the name of Sophocles. Heraclides was deceived by this easily and cited from them as the words of Aeschylus and Sophocles. However, Heraclides seems to have been a versatile and prolific writer on philosophy, mathematics, music, grammar, physics, history and rhetoric, notwithstanding doubts about attribution of many of the works. It appears that he composed various works in dialogue form.

Heraclides also seems to have had an interest in the occult. In particular he focused on explaining trances, visions and prophecies in terms of the retribution of the gods, and reincarnation.

A quote of Heraclides, of particular significance to historians, is his statement that fourth century B.C. Rome was a Greek city.

Heraclides Ponticus refers with much admiration that Pythagoras would remember having been Pirro and before Euphorbus and before some other mortal.

Excerpt from a speech by the character "Heraclides" in Aristotle's work Protrepticus:

So nothing divine or happy belongs to humans apart from just that one thing worth taking seriously, as much insight and intelligence as is in us, for, of what’s ours, this alone seems to be immortal, and this alone divine.  And by being able to share in such a capacity, our way of life, although by nature miserable and difficult, is yet so gracefully managed that, in comparison with the other animals, a human seems to be a god.
(translation from Hutchinson and Johnson, 2015)

Notes

References

Further reading
 Diogenes Laërtius trans. C.D. Yonge (1853) "Lives of Eminent Philosophers"
 O. Voss (1896) De Heraclidis Pontici vita et scriptis
 Wehrli, F. (1969) Herakleides Pontikos. Die Schule des Aristoteles vol. 7, 2nd edn. Basel.
 Heraclides of Pontus. Texts and translations, edited by Eckart Schütrumpf; translators Peter Stork, Jan van Ophuijsen, and Susan Prince, New Brunswick, N.J., Transaction Publishers, 2008
 Heraclides of Pontus. Discussion, edited by William W. Fortenbaugh, Elizabeth Pender, New Brunswick, N.J. : Transaction Publishers, 2009
 Hans B. Gottschalk (1980) Heraclides of Pontus, New York, Oxford University Press
 
 O. Neugebauer (1975) A History of Ancient Mathematical Astronomy

External links 
 

390s BC births
310s BC deaths
4th-century BC Greek people
4th-century BC philosophers
Academic philosophers
Ancient Greek astronomers
Ancient Pontic Greeks
Classical Greek philosophers
People from Heraclea Pontica